The Kandreho Formation is an Early Jurassic (middle or late Toarcian) geological formation of the Mahajanga Basin of Madagascar. The marly limestones of the formation were deposited in a subtidal lagoonal environment. The formation overlies the Bouleiceras and Spiriferina beds of the early Toarcian and has been correlated to the Marrat Formation of Saudi Arabia. Fossils of the marine crocodylian Andrianavoay (originally classed as a species of Steneosaurus) as well as bivalves and the ammonite Nejdia have been found in the formation. The name Kandreho Formation was proposed by Geiger in 2004.

Gallery

See also 
 List of fossiliferous stratigraphic units in Madagascar
 Geology of Madagascar
 Isalo III Formation
 Bemaraha Formation
 Toarcian turnover
 Toarcian formations
Marne di Monte Serrone, Italy
 Calcare di Sogno, Italy
 Sachrang Formation, Austria
 Posidonia Shale, Lagerstätte in Germany
 Ciechocinek Formation, Germany and Poland
 Krempachy Marl Formation, Poland and Slovakia
 Lava Formation, Lithuania
 Azilal Group, North Africa
 Whitby Mudstone, England
 Fernie Formation, Alberta and British Columbia
 Poker Chip Shale
 Whiteaves Formation, British Columbia
 Navajo Sandstone, Utah
 Los Molles Formation, Argentina
 Mawson Formation, Antarctica
 Kota Formation, India
 Cattamarra Coal Measures, Australia

References

Bibliography 
 
 

Geologic formations of Madagascar
Jurassic System of Africa
Early Jurassic Africa
Jurassic Madagascar
Toarcian Stage
Limestone formations
Lagoonal deposits
Paleontology in Madagascar
Formations